Akeem Thomas (born January 5, 1990) is an Antiguan footballer who currently plays for Caledonia AIA and the Antigua and Barbuda national team.

Club career
Thomas began his career in 2009 playing for Bassa in the Antigua and Barbuda Premier Division, and helped the team win the Premier Division title in his first season with the team.

In 2011 Thomas transferred to the new Antigua Barracuda FC team prior to its first season in the USL Professional Division. He made his debut for the Barracudas on April 17, 2011, in the team's first competitive game, a 2–1 loss to the Los Angeles Blues.

International career
Thomas made his debut for the Antigua and Barbuda national team in 2008, and has since gone on to make 13 appearances for his country, scoring one goal. He was also part of the Antigua squad which took part in the final stages of the 2010 Caribbean Championship.

Thomas had a string of exemplary performances in the 2014 CFU Caribbean Cup.  He displayed leadership skills in both the technical and tactical aspects of the game necessary to be a center back at the highest level.  Those performances have invited interest from a host of professional clubs around the world, Tottenham Hotspur of England and Elche FC of Spain, to name a few.  Thomas has been earmarked as one of the leaders on the national team, along with official captain, Quinton Groffith, currently of the Charleston Battery in the United Soccer League (USL), the second tier of soccer in the United States.  His progress has been attributed to hard work and dedication by many former and current coaches.

National team statistics

International goals
Scores and results list Antigua and Barbuda's goal tally first.

References

External links

1990 births
Living people
Antigua and Barbuda footballers
Antigua Barracuda F.C. players
USL Championship players
Antigua and Barbuda international footballers
TT Pro League players
Morvant Caledonia United players
Expatriate footballers in Trinidad and Tobago
2014 Caribbean Cup players
Association football midfielders